Cryoturris serta is an extinct species of sea snail, a marine gastropod mollusk in the family Mangeliidae.

Description
The length of the shell attains 8 mm.

Distribution
This extinct marine species has been found in Pliocene strata of Florida, USA, and in Pliocene strata in Mexico.

References

  de Jong & Coomans, Uitgaven van de Stichting "Natuurwetenschappelijke Studiekring voor Suriname en de Nederlandse Antillen", nrd. 121–122, 1988
 Arthur William Baden Powell, The molluscan families Speightiidae and Turridae: an evaluation of the valid taxa, both recent and fossil, with lists of characteristic species; Auckland Institute and Museum, 1966
 M. C. Perrilliat and P. Flores-Guerrero. 2011. Moluscos de la Formación Agueguexquite (Plioceno inferior) de Coatzacoalcos, Veracruz, México. Revista Mexicana de Ciencias Geológicas 28(3): 379–397

External links

serta